David Samson may refer to:
 David Samson (rabbi) (born 1956), Orthodox rabbi
 David Samson (baseball) (born 1968), president of the Florida Marlins
 David Samson (lawyer) (born 1939), American politician who served as New Jersey Attorney General, 2002–2003, and PANYNJ Chairman, 2011–2014

See also
David Sampson (disambiguation)